Rengg is a locality and a mountain pass in the canton of Lucerne in Switzerland.

It connects Schachen, part of Werthenstein, and Entlebuch. It lies partially in the district of Entlebuch which is a biosphere preserve recognized by UNESCO.

See also
 List of highest paved roads in Europe
 List of mountain passes

Mountain passes of the canton of Lucerne
Mountain passes of Switzerland
Mountain passes of the Alps